First Direct (styled first direct) is a telephone and internet based retail bank division of HSBC Bank plc based in the United Kingdom. First Direct has headquarters in Leeds, England, and has 1.45 million customers. It was awarded Most Trusted Financial Provider by Moneywise in 2019, and was ranked top in the February 2020 Competition and Markets Authority bi-annual survey for overall service quality.

History

First Direct was formed on 1 October 1989 by Midland Bank, one of the 'big four' banks in the United Kingdom. It became a part of HSBC in June 1992, when that business acquired Midland Bank. First Direct took its first call on 12:01am on 1 October 1989; more than 1,000 calls were taken within the first twenty four hours.

The launch of First Direct in 1989 was advertised twofold. Firstly, there was an advert for Audi which was interrupted by a broadcast purportedly back in time from 2010, celebrating the 21st anniversary of the company (the interruption was agreed with Audi beforehand).

Secondly, there were two different adverts running concurrently on ITV and Channel 4, one offering a negative view showing the aspects of normal banking and the other a positive view of First Direct, with the two crossing over at a key point.

By May 1991, the bank had 100,000 customers on its books, and by March 1993, it had 250,000. It first achieved break even in December 1994. In April 1995, the bank gained its 500,000th customer.

In May 1999, it launched text message (SMS) banking, a service through which the bank alerts customers by SMS if the balance on their current account goes below a certain amount, and, if set, will send weekly mini statements also by SMS. The bank began limited trials of internet banking in July 1997, launching the service fully in August 2000.

In July 2001, the bank's Offset Mortgage was launched. In January 2004, the bank launched First Directory, a service whereby additional services were added to current accounts such as free text message banking, annual travel insurance and mobile phone insurance for a fixed monthly charge.

In April 2004, the bank launched Internet Banking Plus, a service whereby account information was taken by third party internet banking from the bank's other accounts with different banks and the information was unified under First Direct's Internet Banking Plus service.

In October 2006, the bank launched a first generation mobile phone banking service in partnership with Monilink, pre dating mobile apps. In February 2007, First Direct became the first bank in the United Kingdom to introduce a fee for basic financial transactions, fuelling concern for the future of fee free banking in the country for personal customers.

In May 2013, First Direct secured naming rights until 2018 for the new Leeds Arena, to be known as the First Direct Arena. In March 2017, it was announced that First Direct had extended its naming sponsorship of Leeds arena for a further five years.

In September 2016, First Direct introduced voice ID technology to verify customers' identities when calling into the bank, the first bank in the United Kingdom to introduce the technology on such a large scale. The following year saw the introduction of a new native mobile app, for both Apple and Android platforms.

In July 2018, First Direct transferred from being a division of HSBC Bank plc to a division of HSBC UK Bank plc, as part of the bank's ringfencing restructure.

References

External links

Banks of the United Kingdom
HSBC
Companies based in Leeds
South Lanarkshire
British companies established in 1989
Banks established in 1989
Online banks
Financial services brands